Clyde is a surname, and may refer to:

 Andrew Clyde (born 1963), American politician
 Andy Clyde (1892–1967), Scottish actor
 Bradley Clyde (born 1970), Australian rugby player
 David Clyde (born 1955), American baseball pitcher
 David Francis Clyde (1925–2002), British tropical physician and malariologist
 George Dewey Clyde, (1898–1972), American politician
 Ian Clyde (born 1956), Canadian boxer
 James Clyde, multiple people
 Jeremy Clyde (born 1941), English actor
 June Clyde (1909–1987), American actress, singer, and dancer
 Norman Clyde (1885–1972), American mountaineer and photographer
 Thomas Clyde, multiple people

History of the surname
This surname originated in Celtic times, and was used in Scotland and Ulster as a name for people who lived by the banks of the River Clyde, which flows through Glasgow. 

The origin of the river's name comes from the Gaelic name "Cluaidh", the original meaning of which is now unclear. Some  believe it is derived from the Brythonic word "clut", meaning "the cleansing one".  There was also a goddess in Celtic mythology named Clota, who was considered the guardian of the river, and the Roman name for the river was Clota. In modern times, Clyde as a given name is also taken to mean “warm” in the sense of “caring and friendly.”

See also
 Clyde (disambiguation)

References